Sumner is an Australian Electronic duo songwriter formed in Launceston, Tasmania, Australia, in 2018. The pair met by living in the small town of Launceston, and finding each other's music through mutual friends. They decided to link up to play a gig as ‘Sumner’. The name 'Sumner' originated from Chloe's middle name. Their song "Stranded" received full rotation on triple j and made it into the Triple J Hottest 200, 2021. Chloe suffers from Epilepsy.

The duo signed to Pnau's label 'Lab78' in 2021. Sumner have recently supported Vera Blue, Montaigne, Slowly Slowly (band) and performed at Party In The Paddock Festival and Falls Festival.

Discography

EP's
'All That I Am EP' (2018)

Singles
'Pictures' (2018)
'Put It Out' (2018)
'Blame Myself' (2019)
'Standed' (2021)
'South' (2021)

References

Living people
Year of birth missing (living people)
Australian musical duos